David McGregor may refer to:
David McGregor (water polo) (1909–?), British water polo player
David Stuart McGregor (1895–1918), Scottish recipient of the Victoria Cross
David McGregor Rogers (1772–1824), farmer and Member of the 2nd Parliament of Upper Canada

See also
David McGregore (1710–1777), member of colonial America Christian clergy
David MacGregor (born 1981), Scottish footballer